Black River Island is an island in Lake Huron.  It is part of a series of shoals around the mouth of Black River and is  NE of it.  The island is included within the unincorporated community of Black River in Alcona Township.

Its area is less than one acre and varies with lake levels.

The shoals in the area are a boating hazard.  The schooner William H. Rounds, carrying a load of coal, ran aground on the island in May 1905 and was destroyed.  Further south the tugboat Loretta, carrying a load of chain, broke its propeller and caught fire in October 1896.  The Ishpeming, a schooner carrying a load of coal, ran aground in November 1903.  It was scrapped and abandoned.  These are marked by  buoys.

In the past, owners of the island have shown interest in selling it to wildlife organizations.  The island is approximately 7 miles south of Scarecrow Island which is part of the Michigan Islands National Wildlife Refuge.

References

Uninhabited islands of Michigan
Islands of Lake Huron in Michigan
Islands of Alcona County, Michigan